Thiago Nascimento dos Santos (born 12 April 1995) is a Brazilian footballer who plays as a winger for Madureira in the Campeonato Carioca.

Career

Flamengo
In the beginning of 2017 during a festive game, Thiago suffered an injury to the knee that turned out to be a torn ACL; and as a result he will miss the beginning of the 2017 season.

On 22 April 2018, Thiago renewed his contract with Flamengo until 2020.

Mumbai City (loan)
On 4 September 2017, Thiago Signed on loan with Indian Super League club Mumbai City until the end of season. Thiago scored on his debut in a match against FC Goa, Mumbai City won 2–1.

Career statistics
(Correct )

Honours
Flamengo
 Campeonato Carioca:  2019

Personal life

He is married to Edinallys Teixeira and has a son Thomaz born in February, 2019.

References

External links

1995 births
Living people
Sportspeople from Paraíba
Brazilian footballers
Association football midfielders
Campeonato Brasileiro Série A players
CR Flamengo footballers
Indian Super League players
Mumbai City FC players
Associação Chapecoense de Futebol players
Brazilian expatriate footballers
Expatriate footballers in India